Lucky 7 is a 2003 television film starring Patrick Dempsey and Kimberly Williams.

Plot summary
Amy Myer (Kimberly Williams) is a woman whose dying mother (Gail O'Grady) made out a timeline for Amy's life and predicted she would marry her seventh boyfriend. But when she falls head over heels for her sixth boyfriend Daniel McCandles (Brad Rowe), she decides to find another sixth boyfriend to dump in order to marry Daniel. She settles on Peter Connor (Patrick Dempsey), a local bagel shop owner who is in love with her. Unfortunately, things don't go as planned when Amy realizes that she has feelings for Peter.

Daniel Lonergan edit:
Amy lives her life based on a timeline that her mother made for her at age seven. Her dying mother told her to become an attorney (she does), and to marry her 7th boyfriend. When her family asked what the definition is that constitutes a “boyfriend” she declares to them all, is that he would be the 7th one who calls her his girlfriend therein locking him into that slot for marriage. She breaks up with boyfriend #5, meets Daniel, who she thinks is perfect for her. She wants him to be #7, not #6, so she goes in search of a #6. Peter runs a bagel shop (but also is an ex-Bear Stearns trader worth 100’s of millions), who loves her and asks her to accompany him to a wedding on Orcas Is. She first turns him down, but then sees him as a #6. They go to the wedding (Amy and Peter) and he tells her he has told his friends at the wedding they're dating and mentions the word "girlfriend", locking Peter into slot 6 driving the two to act like a couple around his friends and his ex-girlfriend who is now remarried and present with Her new boyfriend (Peter's ex-girlfriend broke up with Peter after he resigned from Bear Stearns not knowing Peter generated all this money while at Bear Stearns). They end up having the 'hot lovin', but she tells Peter it was a mistake. Peter asked why, she tells him about the timeline. He asked what happens after marriage, since the plan ends there; they return to the city without speaking further. Amy and Daniel go to a work dinner party that night; Daniel told his boss they were dating and she is his girlfriend (making Daniel #7 by her own declaration shared with her family defining what constitutes a boyfriend therein locking Daniel into number #7). Unfortunatey, Amy realizes she didn't want to have Daniel as #7 as things didn't go as Amy and her mother planned wherein Amy realizes that she has feelings for Peter (deviating from her mother's timeline) then tells Daniel they have never even held hands (let alone sex). She leaves to find Peter, but he wasn't at work; she found him at the island of the wedding they'd attended together (which he apparently owns). They meet up, embrace, and she says she quit her job and is starting fresh. Peter offers her a job at the bagel shop, and we close with Peter and Amy in her apartment; each dressed for getting married.

Cast
 Kimberly Williams-Paisley as Amy Myer
 Patrick Dempsey as Peter Connor
 Brad Rowe as Daniel McCandles
 Brian Markinson as Bernie Myer
 Gail O'Grady as Rachel Myer

External links
 
 

2003 romantic comedy films
2003 television films
2003 films
ABC Family original films
Films about weddings
Films directed by Harry Winer
American romantic comedy films
2000s American films